"Leona" is a debut song written by Bill Shore and David Wills, and recorded by American country music group Sawyer Brown.  It was released in October 1984 as the first single from the album Sawyer Brown.  The song reached #16 on the Billboard Hot Country Singles & Tracks chart.

Chart performance

References

1984 debut singles
1984 songs
Sawyer Brown songs
Songs written by David Wills (singer)
Capitol Records Nashville singles
Curb Records singles
Songs written by Bill Shore